Grunde Kreken Almeland (born 29 March 1991) is a Norwegian politician for the Liberal Party.

He served as a deputy representative to the Parliament of Norway from Oslo during the term 2017–2021. When Ola Elvestuen was appointed to Solberg's Second Cabinet in January 2018 he moved up to full representative. He was the deputy leader of the Young Liberals of Norway until October 2017 and studied law at the University of Oslo until becoming an MP.

References

1991 births
Living people
Members of the Storting
Liberal Party (Norway) politicians
politicians from Oslo